Joël Bourdin (born 25 January 1938) is a former member of the Senate of France who represented the Eure department.  He is a member of the Union for a Popular Movement.

Political career

Debut in Bernay 
A university professor by profession, Joël Bourdin was first elected mayor of Bernay in the 1983 French municipal elections. Two years later, he was elected general councilor of Eure in the canton of Bernay-Ouest. And then became vice-president of the General Council of Eure.

In 2003, he chose to resign from Bernay town hall to devote himself to his other mandates. He is succeeded by his financial assistant Hervé Maurey. He did the same later during the French cantonal elections of 2004 during which he left his place of general councilor of Bernay-Ouest to Hervé Maurey.

In the Senate 
He was elected senator of Eure on 24 September 1989 and re-elected in 1998.

He was triumphantly renewed for a third term as senator in 2008, achieving the best score in his department (58.48% of the vote). However, during the senatorial elections of September 2014, he was at the top of a dissenting list against the UMP-UDI union list but was defeated. The irony of fate wanted this list to be led by his dolphin in favor of whom he resigned from the town hall of Bernay and the Departmental Council of Eure, Hervé Maurey.

His mandates 

 Senator (1989-2014)
 Vice-Chairman of the Eure General Council (→ 2004)
 Mayor of Bernay (1983-2003)
 Bernay municipal councilor (2003-2008)
 Member of the Retreat Orientation Council.
 Regional Councilor of Upper Normandy
 President of the Community of Communes of Bernay and its surroundings

References
Page on the Senate website

1938 births
Living people
Union for a Popular Movement politicians
French Senators of the Fifth Republic
Senators of Eure
Place of birth missing (living people)